Ernest Tytus Bandrowski (3 January 1853 – 28 November 1920) was a Polish chemist.  

Bandrowski was professor at the Jagiellonian University starting in 1896.  He studied crystalloluminescence and described a number of chemical compounds, such as acetylenedicarboxylic acid.

References

External links
  Photograph of E. Bandrowski

1853 births
1920 deaths
People from Rava-Ruska
People from the Kingdom of Galicia and Lodomeria
Academic staff of Jagiellonian University
Polish scientists
Polish chemists
Members of the Diet of Galicia and Lodomeria
Recipients of the Order of Franz Joseph